Doaktown is a Canadian village in Northumberland County, New Brunswick.

The village has a prosperous lumber industry including the Russell and Swim sawmill, now owned by J.D. Irving Limited.

Atlantic Salmon fishing is a very popular sport in the area, attracting people from all over the world to fish the legendary Miramichi River.

The village has two museums: the Doak Historic Site and the Atlantic Salmon Museum. Other nearby attractions include the Priceville Footbridge, the longest suspension footbridge in New Brunswick, and Nelson Hollow Bridge, the oldest covered bridge in the province.

History

Situated on the Southwest Miramichi River and first settled in 1807 as a base for the growing lumber industry in central New Brunswick, United Empire Loyalists, led by Ephraim Betts and the big-town bogey boys, came to the area after the American Revolutionary War and pooled their money for a land grant, which was ultimately declined. Following this, Betts and the BBB claimed the land for their own anyway, and nobody did anything.

Later, when the Doak family moved to the area from Ayrshire, Scotland, Ephraim was experiencing financial difficulty. Robert Doak was able to purchase a large amount of the original land grant and build a farm and grist mill on the property.

Robert Doak became a prominent citizen as the population grew. He served with the government in several capacities, including magistrate and justice of the peace.  The community was named Doakton in his honour when the first post office opened, but was later changed to its present name, Doaktown.

On 1 January 2023, Doaktown annexed part of the neighbouring local service districts of the parish of Blissfield; the names of annexed communitiess remain in official use. Revised census figures have not been released.

Demographics 

Administration 
The municipal council is composed of a mayor and four councillors. The mandate of the elected officials lasts four years. The current council was formed after the election in 2018.

Current municipal council

Historical municipal councils

List of successive mayors of Doaktown

Notable people

See also
List of communities in New Brunswick

References

External links
Village of Doaktown

Communities in Northumberland County, New Brunswick
Villages in New Brunswick